Philip A. Glotzbach, Ph.D. (born 7 July 1950), is an American educator who was the president of Skidmore College. Glotzbach graduated summa cum laude in 1972 with a B.A. from the University of Notre Dame and earned a Ph.D. from Yale University in 1979. He became Skidmore's seventh president in 2003. It was announced in February 25th, 2019 that Philip Glotzbach retired as President of Skidmore College at the end of the 2019-2020 academic year.

During his 15 years as Skidmore's President, the College implemented an ambitious strategic plan (2005-2015) emphasizing student academic engagement, intercultural literacy, and responsible citizenship; increased the financial aid budget by nearly 150% and noticeably increased the diversity of its student population and faculty; completed or started a number of major building projects, including the Northwoods student apartments, the 55,000 square foot Arthur Zankel Music Center, and Sussman Village, which replaced the Scribner Village apartments. 

During this period, the College has invested more than $150M in the physical plant; introduced a new first-year curriculum; restructured the benefits plan while enhancing salaries for faculty and other employees; developed the Tang Teaching Museum and Art Gallery into a national model for fostering interdisciplinary learning through object exhibition; begun an initiative to enhance science education and increase scientific literacy across the student body; and doubled the College’s endowment. Construction of the first phase ($67.5M) of a $120M Center for Integrated Sciences has begun. 

The College responded to the recession of 2008-09 by reducing expenses (more than $9M) and developing a framework for long-term budget planning; in doing so, the College retained its focus on key strategic initiatives that positioned it strongly as the economy recovered. In May 2010, Skidmore completed a $200 million comprehensive Creative Thought – Bold Promise campaign, which raised a total of $216.5 million. In 2015, Skidmore completed a new strategic plan: Creating Pathways to Excellence – the Plan for Skidmore 2015-2025 and is currently nearing the end of its next Comprehensive Campaign: Creating our Future – The Campaign for Skidmore.

Glotzbach retired as Skidmore's president following the 2019-2020 academic year. The college announced that Marc C. Conner, provost of Washington and Lee University, would succeed Glotzbach in July 2020.

References

External links
 
 Official Skidmore Biography

1950 births
Presidents of Skidmore College
University of Notre Dame alumni
Living people